Servas may refer to:

 Servas International, also called Servas Open Doors, a global non-profit organization which allows travelers to be hosted by families and individuals in many countries of the world
 Servas, Ain, a commune of the Ain département in France
 Servas, Gard, a commune of the Gard département in France

See also 
 Servus (disambiguation)